The Xinjiang Library, also known as the Library of Xinjiang Uygur Autonomous Region, is an autonomous region-level public library of the Xinjiang Uygur Autonomous Region of the People's Republic of China, located on Beijing Road in Urumqi.

History
Xinjiang Library was founded in August 1930 as the Xinjiang Provincial Library and renamed as the People's Library of Xinjiang Province in December 1949, which was renamed as the Library of Xinjiang Uygur Autonomous Region when the Xinjiang Uygur Autonomous Region was established in October 1955. 

By the end of 1999, Xinjiang Library had a total of 1.14 million volumes in its collection.

References

Buildings and structures in Xinjiang
Libraries established in 1930